Garland-Buford House is a historic home located near Leasburg, Caswell County, North Carolina.  It was built in 1877, and is a large two-story, rectangular Victorian frame house, three bays wide and two deep. It is set on a full raised basement of fieldstone and brick. It features highly decorated inventive and exuberant sawnwork ornament and a three-bay two-story pedimented front porch.

It was added to the National Register of Historic Places in 1974.

References

Houses on the National Register of Historic Places in North Carolina
Victorian architecture in North Carolina
Houses completed in 1877
Houses in Caswell County, North Carolina
National Register of Historic Places in Caswell County, North Carolina
1877 establishments in North Carolina